Robert I of Dreux, nicknamed the Great ( – 11 October 1188), was the fifth son of Louis VI of France and Adélaide de Maurienne.

Life
In 1137 he received the County of Dreux as an appanage from his father. He held this title until 1184 when he granted it to his son Robert II.

In 1139 he married Agnes de Garlande. In 1145, he married Hawise of Salisbury, becoming count of Perche, as regent to his stepson Rotrou IV.  By his third marriage to Agnes de Baudemont in 1152, he received the County of Braine-sur-Vesle, and the lordships of Fère-en-Tardenois, Pontarcy, Nesle, Longueville, Quincy-en-Tardenois, Savigny, and Baudemont.

Robert I participated in the Second Crusade and was at the Siege of Damascus in 1148. He was credited for bringing the Damask rose from Syria to Europe. In 1158, he fought against the English and participated in the Siege of Séez in 1154.

Marriages and children
1. Agnes de Garlande (1122–1143), daughter of Anseau de Garlande, count of Rochefort.
Simon (1141 – bef. 1182), lord of La Noue
2. Hawise of Salisbury (1118–1152), widow of Rotrou III and daughter of Walter Fitz Edward of Salisbury, Sheriff of Wiltshire
Adèle of Dreux (1145 – aft. 1210), married firstly Valéran III, count of Breteuil, secondly Guy II, lord of Châtillon-sur-Marne, thirdly Jean I de Thorotte, fourthly Raoul III de Nesle, count of Soissons.
Alice or Adelheid (1144–?)
3. Agnes de Baudemont, Countess of Braine, widow of Milo III of Bar-sur-Seine (1130 – c. 1202).
Robert II (1154–1218), count of Dreux and Braine.
Henry (1155–1199), bishop of Orléans
Alix (1156 – aft. 1217), married Raoul I, lord of Coucy
Philippe (1158–1217), bishop of Beauvais.
Isabella (1160–1239), married Hugh III of Broyes
Peter (1161–1186)
William (1163 – aft. 1189), lord of Braye, Torcy, and Chilly
John (1164 – aft. 1189)
Mamilie (1166–1200)
Margaret (1167–?), nun

References

Sources

1120s births
1188 deaths
Sons of kings
Year of birth uncertain
Christians of the Second Crusade
Counts of Dreux
House of Dreux
Burials at the Abbey of Saint-Yved de Braine